Rachel Cooke (born 1969) is a British journalist and writer.

Early life 
Cooke was born in Sheffield, and is the daughter of a university lecturer.

She went to school in Jaffa, Israel, until she was 11, before returning to Sheffield, and attended Oxford University.

Career 
Cooke began her career as a reporter for The Sunday Times. She has also written for the New Statesman, where she is television critic, and is a writer for The Observer newspaper. In the 'Lost Booker Prize' for 1970, announced in March 2010, Cooke was one of the three judges. Since 2010, Cooke has been reviewing graphic novels for The Guardians "Graphic novel of the month".

Cooke's first book, Her Brilliant Career: Ten Extraordinary Women of the Fifties, was published in autumn 2013, Katharine Whitehorn wrote in The Observer that "this excellent book should go far towards setting the record straight" about women's increasing experience of having professional careers rather than being confined to a life as a housewife as accounts of the 1950s commonly assume. Amanda Craig wrote in The Independent that Cooke's "writing does not delve deep but is eloquent, concise, fair-minded, witty and elegant."

Awards 
In 2006, Cooke was named Interviewer of the Year at the British Press Awards and Feature Writer of the Year at the What the Papers Say Awards. In 2010 she was named Writer of the Year at the PPA Awards for her interviews in Esquire.

Personal life 
Cooke is married to the film critic and novelist Anthony Quinn, and lives in Islington, London.

Bibliography

References

External links
 Rachel Cooke's contributor page, Guardian/Observer website
 Contributor page, ''New Statesman

1969 births
Living people
20th-century British journalists
20th-century British women writers
21st-century British journalists
21st-century British women writers
Alumni of the University of Oxford
British journalists
New Statesman people
The Observer people
Writers from Sheffield